Musan Ch'ŏlsan station is a railway station in Musan county, North Hamgyŏng province, North Korea, on the Musan Line of the Korean State Railway.

Although the Sinch'am–Musan section of the Musan line was opened on 15 November 1929, this station was not opened until 1 February 1937.

Local passenger trains running between Musan and Ch'ŏngjin on the southern junction of the Hambuk and P'yŏngra lines serve this station, and there are several daily commuter trains for workers and students between Musan and Komusan. In addition, two daily pairs of local trains, 662/663 and 668/669, operate between Musan and Church'o.

References

Railway stations in North Korea
Railway stations opened in 1937
1937 establishments in Korea